Quzlu (also Romanized as Qūzlū) is a village in Anguran Rural District, Anguran District, Mahneshan County, Zanjan Province, Iran. At the 2006 census, its population was 270, in 58 families.

References 

Populated places in Mahneshan County